Competitive analysis in marketing and strategic management is an assessment of the strengths and weaknesses of current and potential competitors. This analysis provides both an offensive and defensive strategic context to identify opportunities and threats. Profiling combines all of the relevant sources of competitor analysis into one framework in the support of efficient and effective strategy formulation, implementation, monitoring and adjustment. 

Competitive analysis is an essential component of corporate strategy. It is argued that most firms do not conduct this type of analysis systematically enough. Instead, many enterprises operate on what is called "informal impressions, conjectures, and intuition gained through the tidbits of information about competitors every manager continually receives." As a result, traditional environmental scanning places many firms at risk of dangerous competitive blindspots due to a lack of robust competitor analysis. It is important to conduct the competitor analysis at various business stages to provide the best possible product or service for customers.

Competitive analysis
One common and useful technique is constructing a competitor array. The steps may include:

 Define the industry – scope and nature of the industry.
 Determine who the competitors are.
 Determine who the customers are and what benefits they expect.
 Determine the key strengths – for example price, service, convenience, inventory, etc. 
 Rank the key success factors by giving each one a weighting – The sum of all the weightings must add up to one.
 Rate each competitor on each of the key success factors.
 Multiply each cell in the matrix by the factor weighting.

Two additional columns can be added. In one column, a company can be rated on each of the key success factors (try to be objective and honest). In another column, benchmarks can be listed. They are the ideal standards of comparisons on each of the factors. They reflect the workings of a company using all the industry's best practices.

Competitive profiling
The strategic rationale of competitor profiling is simple. Superior knowledge of rivals offers a legitimate source of competitive advantage. The raw material of competitive advantage consists of offering superior customer value in the firm's chosen market. The definitive characteristic of customer value is the adjective, superior. Customer value is defined relative to rival offerings making competitor knowledge an intrinsic component of corporate strategy. Profiling facilitates this strategic objective in three important ways. First, profiling can reveal strategic weaknesses in rivals that the firm may exploit. Second, the proactive stance of competitor profiling will allow the firm to anticipate the strategic response of their rivals to the firm's planned strategies, the strategies of other competing firms, and changes in the environment. Third, this proactive knowledge will give the firms strategic agility. Offensive strategy can be implemented more quickly in order to exploit opportunities and capitalize on strengths. Similarly, defensive strategy can be employed more deftly in order to counter the threat of rival firms from exploiting the firm's own weaknesses.

Firms practising systematic and advanced competitor profiling may have a significant advantage. A comprehensive profiling capability is a core competence required for successful competition.

A common technique is to create detailed profiles on each of the major competitors. These profiles give an in-depth description of the competitor's background, finances, products, markets, facilities, personnel, and strategies. This involves:

 Background
 location of offices, plants, and online presences
 history – key personalities, dates, events, and trends
 ownership, corporate governance, and organizational structure
 Financials
 P-E ratios, dividend policy, and profitability
 various financial ratios, liquidity, and cash flow
 profit growth profile; method of growth (organic or acquisitive)
 Products
 products offered, depth and breadth of product line, and product portfolio balance
 new products developed, new product success rate, and R&D strengths
 brands, the strength of brand portfolio, brand loyalty and brand awareness
 patents and licenses
 quality control conformance
 reverse engineering or deformulation
 Marketing
 segments served, market shares, customer base, growth rate, and customer loyalty
 promotional mix, promotional budgets, advertising themes, ad agency used, sales force success rate, online promotional strategy
 distribution channels used (direct & indirect), exclusivity agreements, alliances, and geographical coverage
 pricing, discounts, and allowances
 Facilities
 plant capacity, capacity utilization rate, age of plant, plant efficiency, capital investment
 location, shipping logistics, and product mix by plant
 Personnel
 number of employees, key employees, and skill sets
 strength of management, and management style
 compensation, benefits, and employee morale & retention rates
 Corporate and marketing strategies
 objectives, mission statement, growth plans, acquisitions, and divestitures
 marketing strategies

Media scanning
Scanning competitor's ads can reveal much about what that competitor believes about marketing and their target market. Changes in a competitor's advertising message can reveal new product offerings, new production processes, a new branding strategy, a new positioning strategy, a new segmentation strategy, line extensions and contractions, problems with previous positions, insights from recent marketing or product research, a new strategic direction, a new source of sustainable competitive advantage, or value migrations within the industry. It might also indicate a new pricing strategy such as penetration, price discrimination, price skimming, product bundling, joint product pricing, discounts, or loss leaders. It may also indicate a new promotion strategy such as push, pull, balanced, short term sales generation, long term image creation, informational, comparative, affective, reminder, new creative objectives, new unique selling proposition, new creative concepts, appeals, tone, and themes, or a new advertising agency. It might also indicate a new distribution strategy, new distribution partners, more extensive distribution, more intensive distribution, a change in geographical focus, or exclusive distribution. Similar techniques can be used by observing a competitor's search engine optimization targets and practices.

A competitor's media strategy reveals budget allocation, segmentation and targeting strategy, and selectivity and focus. From a tactical perspective, it can also be used to help a manager implement his own media plan. By knowing the competitor's media buy, media selection, frequency, reach, continuity, schedules, and flights, the manager can arrange their own media plan so that they do not coincide.

Other sources of corporate intelligence include trade shows, patent filings, mutual customers, annual reports, and trade associations.

Some firms hire competitor intelligence professionals to obtain this information. The Society of Competitive Intelligence Professionals maintains a listing of individuals who provide these services.

New competitors
In addition to analysing current competitors, it is necessary to estimate future competitive threats. The most common sources of new competitors are:
Companies competing in a related product/market
Companies using related technologies
Companies already targeting the target prime market segment but with unrelated products
Companies from other geographical areas and with similar products
New start-up companies organized by former employees and/or managers of existing companies
The entrance of new competitors is likely when:
There are high profit margins in the industry
There is unmet demand (insufficient supply) in the industry
There are no major barriers to entry
There is future growth potential
Competitive rivalry is not intense
Gaining a competitive advantage over existing firms is feasible
Dissatisfaction with the existing suppliers

See also
Marketing
Industry information
Marketing management
Marketing plan
Competitive intelligence
Porter's five forces analysis
PEST analysis

Notes

References 
 Craig Fleisher and Babette Bensoussan: "Business and Competitive Analysis: Effective Application of New and Classic Methods." FT Press, 2007.
 Craig Fleisher and Babette Bensoussan: "Strategic and Competitive Analysis: Methods and Techniques for Analyzing Business Competition." Prentice Hall, 2003.
Ian Gordon: Beat the Competition. How to Use Competitive Intelligence to Develop Winning Business Strategies. Basil Blackwell Publishers, Oxford/UK 1989
 Estelle Metayer: "Demystifying Competitive Intelligence" Ivey Business Journal, Nov 1999
 Michael E. Porter: Competitive Strategy: Techniques for Analyzing Industries and Competitors 1998.

Business analysis
Competition (economics)
Market research
Marketing strategy